L&YR Class 30 may refer to any of the following steam locomotives:

 L&YR Class 30 (Aspinall)
 L&YR Class 30 (Hughes)
 L&YR Class 30 (Hughes compound)